Elements Music is an independent music publishing and producer management company based in Helsinki, Finland.

Elements Music has had a multitude of number one albums and singles domestically as well as internationally and has been awarded the "Music Publisher of the Year" prize in 2014, 2015 and 2016 at the annual Industry Awards. International artists who have recorded songs published by Elements Music include Pentatonix, Lost Frequencies, Alle Farben, Jake Miller, Tiffany Gia, Michael Schulte, Jolin Tsai, Kara, Shinee ja Sean Kingston and, for example, Robin, Isac Elliot, Anna Abreu, Antti Tuisku, Mikael Gabriel, Suvi Teräsniska in Finland.

The company's offices are located at The Grind Studios and is owned and run by the CEO, Tommi Tuomainen and A&R, Eero Tolppanen. The company's house writer roster currently consists of the following artists, writers, and producers:

Artists
Kasmir
Nopsajalka
Miro Miikael
Alex Mattson
Alisky
Møtions
Bess
View
Visti
Softengine

Writers
Axel Ehnström 
Risto Asikainen 
Mikko Kuoppala
Maija Vilkkumaa
Tobias Granbacka
Kyösti Salokorpi
Joel Melasniemi
Väinö Wallenius
Heidi Maria Paalanen

Producers
Mikko Tamminen 
Pasi Siitonen
Matias Melleri
Antti Hynninen
OP Vuorinen
Leo Jupiter
Samuli Sirviö 
Jonas Olsson
Niko Lith

References

Music publishing companies
Entertainment companies of Finland
Finnish record labels